Grade II historic buildings  are those of special merit in Hong Kong.  Efforts are required to preserve the building selectively.

Note: This list is accurate  A territory-wide grade reassessment has been ongoing since. See this link for the latest grading update.

Central and Western District

|}

Eastern District

|}

Islands District

|}

Kowloon City District

|}

Kwun Tong District

|}

North District

|}

Sai Kung District

|}

Sha Tin District

|}

Sham Shui Po District

|}

Southern District

|}

Tai Po District

|}

Tsuen Wan District

|}

Tuen Mun District

|}

Wan Chai District

|}

Wong Tai Sin District

|}

Yau Tsim Mong District

|}

Yuen Long District

|}

See also

 List of buildings and structures in Hong Kong
 Heritage conservation in Hong Kong
 Declared monuments of Hong Kong
 List of Grade I historic buildings in Hong Kong
 List of Grade III historic buildings in Hong Kong
 Heritage Trails in Hong Kong
 History of Hong Kong

References

External links
 List of Graded Historic Buildings in Hong Kong (as at 6 November 2009)

 
Declared monuments
Historic Hong Kong Grade 2